The 2013–14 Ukrainian Cup  is the 23rd annual season of Ukraine's football knockout competition.

The decision on a schedule of competitions for clubs of the First and Second League and leagues composition was confirmed on June 20, 2013 at a session of Central Council of the Professional Football League of Ukraine

Shakhtar Donetsk are the defending Ukrainian Cup champions for the last three years in a row. As a member of the Premier League enter the competition in the Round of 32.

Team allocation 

Fifty one teams will enter into the Ukrainian Cup competition.

Distribution

Round and draw dates
All draws held at FFU headquarters (Building of Football) in Kyiv unless stated otherwise.

Source: Competition calendar at the Premier League website

Competition schedule

First Preliminary Round (1/64)

In this round entered 4 clubs from the 2013–14 Ukrainian Second League and the finalists of the Ukrainian Amateur Cup. The round matches were played on 24 July 2013.

Notes:
  Nove Zhyttia Andriyivka played its home game at Kolos Stadium, Mashivka (Poltava Oblast)

Second Preliminary Round (1/32)

In this round 15 clubs from 2013–14 Ukrainian First League (except Dynamo-2 Kyiv) and the higher seeded clubs from the 2013–14 Ukrainian Second League will enter. They will be drawn against the three winners of the First Preliminary Round.
The round matches were played on 7 August 2013.

Notes:
 Due to the construction of the N.I. Horiushkin Memorial Stadium in Sverdlovsk, match played at Avanhard Stadium in Rovenky.

Round of 32
In this round all 16 teams from the 2013–14 Ukrainian Premier League entered the competition. They and the 16 winners from the previous round consisting of nine clubs from the 2013–14 Ukrainian First League and seven clubs from the 2013–14 Ukrainian Second League are drawn in this round. The draw was performed 4 September. The game between Nyva and UkrAhroKom was postponed to the next day due to schedule conflict as two games are scheduled at Ternopil City Stadium (the other being between city teams of Ternopil and Poltava).

Round of 16
In this round  were drawn the 16 winners from the previous round consisting of 9 teams from the Premier League, four clubs from the 2013–14 Ukrainian First League and three clubs from the 2013–14 Ukrainian Second League. The draw took place on September 27, 2013.
The match between Nyva and Arsenal Kyiv has been brought forward one day due to schedule conflict as two games are scheduled at Ternopil City Stadium (the other being between city teams of Ternopil and Vorskla).

Notes:

 Match was not played. Arsenal Kyiv informed the Ukrainian Premier League that the club would not arrive for the scheduled cup game against Nyva Ternopil because of Arsenal's financial situation. Nyva advance to the next round of the competition.

 Match was not played. Dnipro Dnipropetrovsk did not arrive for the match as the plane with the team was not able to land due to fog forcing airport closures. Control Disciplinary Committee of the Football Federation of Ukraine deny Dnipro's request to play the match at a later date and are expelled from the Cup competition. Chornomorets advance to the next round of the competition. (21 November 2013)

Quarterfinals
In this round entered the eight winners from the previous round consisting of four teams from the Premier League, two clubs from the Persha Liha, and two clubs from the Druha Liha will be drawn in this round. The draw was made on 23 January 2014.

Semifinals
In this round entered the four winners from the previous round consisting of three teams from the Premier League and one club from the Druha Liha will be drawn in this round. By qualifying for the semifinals Slavutych Cherkasy became the first team from the Druha Liha to ever reach this far in the Ukrainian Cup competition.  The draw took place 2 April 2014.

Final

The final was originally to be played at Metalist Stadium, Kharkiv but was moved to Butovsky Vorskla Stadium in Poltava.

Top goalscorers
The competition's top ten goalscorers including qualification rounds.

Over 80 players scored once for their respective teams. Six more players scored against their respective teams.

See also 
2013–14 Ukrainian Premier League
2013–14 Ukrainian First League
2013–14 Ukrainian Second League
2013–14 UEFA Europa League

References

Cup
Ukrainian Cup
Ukrainian Cup seasons